Khan Sulayman Pasha is a large khan in the Old City of Damascus.

See also
Azm Palace
Khan As'ad Pasha
Khan Jaqmaq
Khan Tuman

References

Hotel buildings completed in 1736
Caravanserais in Damascus
Ottoman architecture in Damascus
Buildings and structures inside the walled city of Damascus
1730s establishments in Ottoman Syria
18th-century establishments in Ottoman Syria